Lauren Marlene Storm (born January 2, 1987) is an American actress and acting coach. She is perhaps best known for her role as Taylor Hagan in the television series Flight 29 Down and as Teresa Kilmer in the 2009 film I Love You, Beth Cooper.

Early life
Storm was born in Chicago, Illinois, near a village located in Cook County. Her father, Dave, is a dentist, and her mother, Barb, a magazine editor. Storm's father is of German background and her mother is Jewish, and Storm was raised in the Jewish religion. Storm started modeling at the age of nine. She graduated from Barbizon Modeling and Acting School of Chicago and at age twelve, she participated in a talent competition, which was held in New York City for aspiring models and actors. She received responses from several theatrical agencies and was asked to relocate to Los Angeles for a pilot season. She stayed in the city for six months and got her first major acting job, a number of other roles followed afterwards and she stayed permanently, eventually residing in Burbank, California.

Career
Storm made her major acting debut in a two episode stint on the television drama, Boston Public. Her other television credits include, Malcolm in the Middle, 24, Joan of Arcadia, CSI: Miami, Still Standing, 7th Heaven and Drop Dead Diva.

From 2005 to 2007, she co-starred in Discovery Kids serial drama, Flight 29 Down as Taylor Hagan.

She also co-starred in the films The Game Plan, Mrs. Harris, I Love You, Beth Cooper opposite Hayden Panettiere and the Thomas Dekker-directed film, Whore opposite Megan Fox.

Other interests
Storm has done charity work throughout the years. She has supported Kids with a Cause, the Olive Crest Foundation, the Jonathan Jaques Cancer Walk, Ronald McDonald House Charities, The LA Mission, Project Angelfood, Make a Wish Foundation and St. Jude Children's Hospital.

Storm currently serves as a StarPower Ambassador for the Starlight Children's Foundation, encouraging other young people to commit their time to help other children and working with Starlight to brighten the lives of seriously ill children.

Filmography

Film

Television

References

External links

 
LaurenStormart.com

1987 births
Living people
21st-century American actresses
Actresses from Chicago
American child actresses
American child models
American female models
American film actresses
American people of German descent
American television actresses
Jewish American actresses
People from Cook County, Illinois
21st-century American Jews